Adelaide of Lauffen (also Adelheid von Lauffen;  – after 1130) was a German noblewoman.

Family Background
Adelaide was the daughter of Count Henry II of Lauffen (d.1067) and his wife, Ida of Hövel (1030?-1090), daughter of Bernard I, count of Werl and Hövel. From her parents, Adelaide inherited Hövel, Unna, Telgte und Warendorf.

Marriages and Children 
Adelaide was married twice. Around 1090, Adelaide married, as her first husband, Adolf II of Berg. With Adolf Adelaide had three sons: 
Adolf III of Berg 
Bruno of Berg, later archbishop of Cologne (r.1131-1137)
Everhard/Eberhard, later abbot of the monastery of Georgenthal

After Adolf’s death in 1106, Adelaide married Frederick I/V, count of Sommerschenburg, and count palatine of Saxony (r. 1111-1120). With Frederick, Adelaide had two children: 
Frederick II/VI of Sommerschenburg, count palatine of Saxony (d.1162), who married his niece, Lutgard of Salzwedel
Adelaide, who married Goswin II of Heinsberg, and had two children with him: Goswin III of Heinsberg, and Philip of Heinsberg, later archbishop of Cologne (r.1167-1191).

Notes

References
 S. Corsten and L. Gillessen, '‘Philipp von Heinsberg 1167-1191. Erzbischof und Reichskanzler. Studien und Quellen Museumsschriften des Kreises Heinsberg 12 (Heinsberg, 1991).
 A. Thiele, Erzählende genealogische Stammtafeln zur europäischen Geschichte Band I, Teilband 2 Deutsche Kaiser-, Königs-, Herzogs- und Grafenhäuser II (R.G. Fischer Verlag, 1994). 
P. Leidinger, Untersuchungen zur Geschichte der Grafen von Werl. Ein Beitrag zur Geschichte des Hochmittelalters. Verein für Geschichte und Altertumskunde Westfalens Abteilung (Paderborn, 1965).
 T.R. Kraus, Die Entstehung der Landesherrschaft der Grafen von Berg bis zum Jahre 1225'' (Schmidt, Neustadt an der Aisch, 1981).

External links 
Adelheid von Laufen at the website:Foundation for Medieval Genealogy 

11th-century German women
12th-century German women